Timberville is a town in Rockingham County, Virginia, United States. The population was 2,522 at the 2010 census, which was a significant increase from the 1,739 reported in the 2000 census. It is part of the Harrisonburg Metropolitan Statistical Area.

History
Prior to European colonization, the land upon which Timberville sits was inhabited by Indigenous peoples for thousands of years. The earliest white settlers of Timberville were mostly Pennsylvania Dutch who migrated to the Shenandoah Valley.

Geography
Timberville is located at  (38.634273, −78.776422).

According to the United States Census Bureau, the town has a total area of 0.9 square miles (2.3 km), all of which is land.

Transportation
The primary roads providing access to Timberville are Virginia State Route 42 and Virginia State Route 211.  SR 42 heads north and south, connecting to Virginia State Route 259 in Broadway to the south. To the north, SR 42 heads mostly through rural areas of southwestern Shenandoah County. SR 211 heads east from Timberville, connecting to Interstate 81 and U.S. Route 211 in New Market.

Demographics

At the 2000 census 1,739 people, 735 households, and 465 families resided in the town. The population density was 1,968.1 per square mile (763.0/km). There were 770 housing units at an average density of 871.5 per square mile (337.8/km).  The racial makeup of the town was 97.35% White, 0.17% African American, 0.12% Native American, 0.17% Asian, 1.21% from other races, and 0.98% from two or more races. Hispanic or Latino of any race were 4.31% of the population. 30% of Timberville's residents were German, 11% English, 8% Irish, 3% Mexican, and 2% Dutch. Scotch-Irish, Italians, Russians, Scottish, French, Swiss, Polish, French Canadians and Yugoslavians each constituted 1%.

Of the 735 households 27.5% had children under the age of 18 living with them, 47.8% were married couples living together, 12.0% had a female householder with no husband present, and 36.7% were non-families. 32.4% of households were one person and 17.6% were one person aged 65 or older. The average household size was 2.29 and the average family size was 2.89.

The age distribution was 22.0% under the age of 18, 7.2% from 18 to 24, 27.9% from 25 to 44, 21.6% from 45 to 64, and 21.3% 65 or older. The median age was 40 years. For every 100 females, there were 86.2 males. For every 100 females age 18 and over, there were 78.0 males.

The median household income was $33,750 and the median family income  was $41,417. Males had a median income of $27,230 versus $19,099 for females. The per capita income for the town was $16,450. About 7.2% of families and 10.9% of the population were below the poverty line, including 12.8% of those under age 18 and 17.7% of those age 65 or over.

References

 
Towns in Rockingham County, Virginia
Towns in Virginia